Wheego Technologies is an American company headquartered in Atlanta, Georgia. Wheego develops emerging vehicle technologies including software, systems and tools for self-driving cars or autonomous vehicles, artificial intelligence/machine learning, and IoT connected devices for the home, business and roadway. The company is led by CEO Mike McQuary.

Wheego Technologies began as an electric car company, Wheego Electric Cars. The company was formed as a spin-out from Rough and Tuff Electric Vehicles (RTEV), a manufacturer of battery-powered recreational electric vehicles in June 2009, with Mike McQuary as CEO. The company is headquartered in Atlanta, Georgia. In 2015, Wheego turned its attention to developing tools and systems for autonomous vehicles, and in 2016 the company name was changed to Wheego Technologies.

Wheego has offices in Atlanta, Georgia and Sonoma, California.

Products

Wheego Whip 

Wheego Electric Cars' first automobile was a two-seat compact car that was launched in the United States in August 2009, in partnership with Shuanghuan Auto. The car is based on the "Noble" platform manufactured by Shuanghuan Auto, with final assembly, including the motor, drive train, controller, electronic components and programming, completed in the US.

It is marketed exclusively by Wheego under the Wheego Whip name in North America, Japan and the Caribbean. It was launched as a low-speed vehicle (LSV),  or Medium Speed Vehicle, depending on local state regulations. The low-speed version features dry cell sealed (AGM) lead-acid batteries with a range of  80 kilometers (50 mi) on a single charge.

Wheego LiFe 

The Wheego LiFe is a highway-capable version with a lithium iron phosphate battery pack. The Wheego LiFe began selling in April, 2011.  The LiFe is a small sized car sourced from China, with electric drivetrain and batteries installed in California. Its 30-kilowatt-hour lithium battery pack is coupled to a 60-horsepower electric motor. It’s a commuter car, priced at $32,995.  It became the third all-electric highway speed street legal car for sale in the U.S. after the Tesla Roadster and Nissan Leaf. The LiFe is fully NHTSA/DOT compliant and has passed all U.S. crash-testing. It is electronically limited to 65 mph, and has a range of approximately 100 miles on a single charge. The LiFe can be recharged using either a standard 120 V connection or an industry-standard Level 2 Charging Station. It is sold through a dealer network covering the U.S., Japan and the Caribbean.

References

External links

Vehicle manufacturing companies established in 2009
Electric vehicle manufacturers of the United States
Manufacturing companies based in Atlanta